St. Thomas Primitive Baptist Church is a historic church building in Summit, Oklahoma. The church was built in 1922 for the Primitive Baptist congregation and is the oldest surviving structure in Summit, a historically all-black town. It was built by Rev. L. W. Thomas. The building is a front-gabled, sandstone building with a square cupola on the ridge of the east end, over the entrance. It was listed on the National Register of Historic Places in 2004 for its importance to the historical settlement and the social history of the black community in Oklahoma.

References

African-American history of Oklahoma
Baptist churches in Oklahoma
Churches on the National Register of Historic Places in Oklahoma
Buildings and structures in Muskogee County, Oklahoma
Churches completed in 1922
National Register of Historic Places in Muskogee County, Oklahoma
1922 establishments in Oklahoma
Primitive Baptists